This article lists some of the longest ring roads in the world.

Under construction
 Central Yunnan Urban Economic Ring Expressway, over  completed.
Hyderabad Regional Ring Road, planned length of 330 km (205 mi).

References

Longest
Longest ring roads
Longest ring roads
Ring roads